is an underground metro station located in Midori-ku, Nagoya, Aichi, Japan operated by the Nagoya Municipal Subway’s Sakura-dōri Line. It is located 16.9 kilometers from the terminus of the Sakura-dōri Line at Nakamura Kuyakusho Station.

History
Kamisawa Station was opened on March 27, 2011.

Lines

 (Station number: S19)

Layout
Aioiyama Station has a single underground island platform with Platform screen doors.

Platforms

References

External links
 Aioiyama Station official web site 

Railway stations in Japan opened in 2011
Railway stations in Aichi Prefecture